Double D Dodgeball is a sports video game developed and published by Yuke's exclusively for Xbox 360. The game was released on 16 July 2008.

References

External links
Double D Dodgeball announcement on IGN
YUKE'S Company of America website

2008 video games
Sports video games
Video games developed in Japan
Xbox 360 games
Xbox 360 Live Arcade games
Xbox 360-only games
Yuke's games

Multiplayer and single-player video games